Hamari Betiyan also called Our Darling Daughters is a 1936 social Hindi film directed by R. S. Chowdhary. It was produced by Ardeshir Irani under his Imperial Film Company banner. The film starred Rose, Kumar, Pramila, Mubarak, Jilloobai, Baba Vyas and Baby Shri. Rose co-starred with her cousin Pramila who had started acting in films from 1935 with Ardeshir Irani's  Imperial Film Company's Return Of Toofan Mail (1935). The story of Hamari Betiyan is about the travails of Radha and her subsequent revenge against the people who caused her grief and anguish.

Plot
Radha (Rose) and Prince Madan (Kumar) are college mates who fall in love. Despite strong objection from his father the king (Baba Vyas), Madan marries Radha. Through the evil intrigues of Vasant (Pramila) and Lal Singh (Mubarak), Madan is cast out of the kingdom. Radha becomes blind and her husband abandons her. Radha meets up with her mother who had been separated from her and has now become a priestess. Radha's sight is restored and she gets hold of a buried treasure. With that she pretends to be a princess and takes revenge against all who wronged her.

Cast

Rose: Radha
Kumar: Prince Madan
Pramila: Vasanti
Mubarak: Lal Singh
Baba Vyas: The King
Jilloobai: Radha's mother
Baby Shri

Songs
"Ae Ri Nindiya Aan Baso In Nainun Mein"
"Aaye Mandir More"
"Dekho Leela Prabhu Ki"
"Ae Mahajabin Yeh Rang Roop Tera"
"Nahin Bhaye Jo Kismet Mein"
"Jaag Jaag Re Murkh Banday"
"Mamjanani, Shaant Sheele"

References

External links

1936 films
1930s Hindi-language films
Indian black-and-white films
Films scored by Annasaheb Mainkar